Ascidiota is a genus of liverworts belonging to the family Porellaceae. The genus is monotypic, with Ascidiota blepharophylla being the only representative species.

Ascidiota is found in Eastern Russia and Alaska.

References

Porellales
Porellales genera
Monotypic bryophyte genera